The 1966 FIBA Europe Under-18 Championship was an international basketball  competition held in Porto San Giorgio, Italy in 1966.

Final ranking
1. 

2. 

3. 

4. 

5. 

6. 

7. 

8.

Awards

External links
FIBA Archive

Under-18 
FIBA
1966
FIBA U18 European Championship